Virginia University of Lynchburg is a private historically black Christian university in Lynchburg, Virginia. The university is accredited by the Transnational Association of Christian Colleges and Schools and offers instruction and degrees, primarily in religious studies, including a Doctorate of Ministry program. The campus is a historic district listed on the National Register of Historic Places.

History

Virginia University of Lynchburg is the oldest school of higher learning in Lynchburg. The school was founded in 1886 and incorporated in 1888 by the Virginia Baptist State Convention as the coeducational "Lynchburg Baptist Seminary". Classes were first held in 1890 under the name Virginia Seminary. With the offering of a collegiate program in 1900, the name was again changed, to Virginia Theological Seminary and College. In 1962, the institution was renamed to the Virginia Seminary and College. Finally, in 1996, the school was given its current name.  The campus includes three historic academic buildings on : Graham Hall (1917), Humbles Hall (1920–21) and the Mary Jane Cachelin Memorial Science and Library Building (1946).  These buildings and the Hayes Monument (c. 1906) comprise a historic district, which was listed on the National Register of Historic Places in 2010.

Its first President was the Rev. Phillip F. Morris, pastor of the city's Court Street Baptist Church. Seeking a financial patron, Morris agreed to step down as president rather than yield to the demand of the American Baptist Home Mission Society that he step down from the pulpit to assume full-time leadership of the school. Rev. Morris would later serve as President of the National Baptist Convention. Rev. Gregory W. Hayes, a graduate of Oberlin College, assumed the full-time position as president in 1891, serving until his death in 1906. His wife, Mary Rice Hayes Allen, biracial daughter of a Confederate general and mother of author Carrie Allen McCray, assumed the presidency until replaced by Dr. JRL Diggs in 1908.

During Hayes' administration, controversy arose between black separatists and accommodationists over the future of the school. The chief patron wished it to become a pre-collegiate manual training institution. Hayes, among the separatists, returned the patronage to retain and strengthen black autonomy and academic integrity. This move eventually led to a schism within the National Baptist Convention.

In July 2010, the school reached an agreement with Liberty University to help VUL students looking for degrees not offered at the school to complete their degrees at Liberty.

University Presidents
The following have led Virginia University of Lynchburg since its founding:

  Philip F. Morris, 1888-1890
  Gregory W. Hayes, 1891-1906
  Mary Rice Hayes Allen, 1906-1908
  James Robert Lincoln Diggs, 1908-1911
  Robert C. Woods, 1911-1926
  William H.R. Powell, 1926-1929, 1934-1946
  Vernon Johns, 1929-1934
  Madison C. Allen, 1946-1966
  MacCarthy C. Sutherland, 1966-1980
  Benjamin W. Robertson, 1980
  Leroy Fitts, 1980-1981
  Thomas E. Parker, 1982-1987
  Melvin R. Boone, 1988-1990
  Ada M. Palmer, 1990-1992
  Elisha G. Hall, 1992-1999
  Ralph Reavis, 2000-2015
  Kathy C. Franklin, Ph.D., 2016 - Present

Athletics
The VUL athletic teams are called the Dragons. The university is a member of the National Christian College Athletic Association (NCCAA). The Dragons were formerly a member of the United States Collegiate Athletic Association (USCAA). VUL previously competed as a member of the Central Intercollegiate Athletic Association (CIAA), which is currently a NCAA Division II athletic conference, from 1921–22 to 1953–54.

VUL competes in eight intercollegiate varsity sports: Men's sports include basketball, football and track & field (indoor and outdoor); while women's sports include basketball, track & field (indoor and outdoor) and volleyball.

Notable alumni and faculty
Lawrence Carter, civil rights historian
John Chilembwe, a Nyasa (Malawian) Baptist preacher and leader of the 1915 Chilembwe uprising. Graduated in 1901.
Georgia Mabel DeBaptiste, academic
James Robert Lincoln Diggs, pastor and civil rights activist 
Herman Dreer (1888–1981), academic administrator, educator, educational reformer and activist, author, editor, minister, and civil rights leader 
Vernon Johns, pastor and civil rights activist 
W. Henry Maxwell, politician and pastor 
Stella James Sims, biology professor at Storer College, Virginia University of Lynchburg, and Bluefield State College
Anne Spencer, poet, teacher, civil rights activist, librarian, and gardener

References

External links

 
 Official athletics website

Educational institutions established in 1886
Educational institutions established in 1888
Historically black universities and colleges in the United States
Education in Lynchburg, Virginia
Seminaries and theological colleges in Virginia
Transnational Association of Christian Colleges and Schools
Buildings and structures in Lynchburg, Virginia
University and college buildings on the National Register of Historic Places in Virginia
USCAA member institutions
National Register of Historic Places in Lynchburg, Virginia
1886 establishments in Virginia
1888 establishments in Virginia
Non-profit organizations based in Lynchburg, Virginia
Historic districts on the National Register of Historic Places in Virginia